Al Jazirah Al Hamra Club is a professional football club located in Al Jazirah Al Hamra, United Arab Emirates. They currently play in the UAE First Division League.

Current squad

As of UAE Division One:

References

External links 

Football clubs in the United Arab Emirates
Al Hamra
Sport in the Emirate of Ras Al Khaimah